Mario Castro (born 8 January 1962) is a Cuban gymnast. He competed in eight events at the 1980 Summer Olympics.

References

1962 births
Living people
Cuban male artistic gymnasts
Olympic gymnasts of Cuba
Gymnasts at the 1980 Summer Olympics
Place of birth missing (living people)
Pan American Games medalists in gymnastics
Pan American Games silver medalists for Cuba
Gymnasts at the 1979 Pan American Games
Medalists at the 1979 Pan American Games
20th-century Cuban people